Juegos de verano  (Summer Games) is a 1973 Argentine erotic film directed by  Juan Antonio Serna and starring Linda Peretz and 
Ricardo Morán.

Plot
Five girls from different Latin American countries join young people in a house in Delta del Tigre. The troupe of young girls is headed by actress Linda Peretz.

Cast
  Linda Peretz
  Ricardo Morán
  Irma Ferrazzi
  Hilda Blanco
  Alberto Mazzini
  Alfredo Zemma
  Alcira Moro
  Susana Maraldino
  Susana Villafañe as Narcisa
  Virginia Faiad			
  Rosa Aroza	
  Susana Maldy		
  Xunta Malek		
  Javier Luis Pressa		
  Julio Sanchez Paz		
  Cristian Shell

Production
The film was made in 1969 but not released until 1973. It is described as a soft core porn film with lesbian scenes which was made pornographic with added scenes when released overseas. These sex scenes caused legal problems and had to be censored for the Argentine market, which significantly delayed the release of the film.

Reception
La Prensa opined that "All the elements have been played with awkwardness and memorable lack of imagination". Raúl Manrupe and Maria Portela in their book Un diccionario de films argentinos (1930-1995) wrote: "Forgotten incursion of 70s erotic cinema to which some porn scenes were added for its exhibition abroad".

References

External links

1973 films
Argentine erotic films
1970s erotic films